The 1984 African Cup of Nations Final was a football match that took place on 18 March 1984, and was the final match of the 14th edition of the Africa Cup of Nations). It was hosted by Côte d'Ivoire at the Stade Félix Houphouët-Boigny in Abidjan. Cameroon won its first championship, beating Nigeria in the final 3−1.

Road to the final

Match

Details

External links
Final match details - 11v11.com
Qualifications details - rsssf

Final
1984
1984
1984
1983–84 in Nigerian football
1984 in Cameroonian football
March 1984 sports events in Africa
20th century in Ivory Coast